Pulianthoppu is a village in the Thanjavur taluk of Thanjavur district, Tamil Nadu, India.

Demographics 

As per the 2001 census, Pulianthoppu had a total population of 2696 with 1373 males and 1323 females. The sex ratio was 964. The literacy rate was 86.43.

References 

 

Villages in Thanjavur district